Podhale Nowy Targ is a Polish ice hockey club based in Nowy Targ, Poland. They currently play in the Polska Hokej Liga. Legally, they are known as SSA KH Podhale Nowy Targ, and TatrySki Podhale Nowy Targ for sponsorship reasons. Since 2020 Tauron Podhale Nowy Targ.

Home ice 
Name:  Miejska Hala Lodowa w Nowym Targu
Address:  ul. Parkowa 14, 34-400 Nowy Targ, Poland
Capacity: 3500

Major achievements 

 Polish Championships (19): 1966, 1969, 1971, 1972, 1973, 1974, 1975, 1976,1977, 1978, 1979, 1987, 1993, 1994, 1995, 1996, 1997, 2007, 2010.
 Polish Vice-Championships (11): 1963, 1964, 1970, 1980, 1981, 1982, 1986, 1990, 1998, 2000, 2004.
 Third place (12): 1958, 1960, 1961, 1962, 1984, 1985, 1991, 1992, 1999, 2006, 2008, 2009
 Polish Cup titles (2): 2004, 2005.
 Interliga Championship (1): 2004.

Current squad (2022/23) 

Goaltenders:
  Pawel Bizub
  Szymon Klimowski
  Oskar Polak
  Kevin Lindskoug

Defencemen:
  Alexander Alexadrov
  Tomas Jelinek
  Robert Mrugała
  Jakub Malasinski
  Eetu Moksunen
  Patryk Wsół
  Dominik Szlembarski
  Damian Tomasik
  Ondrej Vorlab
  Luka Zorko

Forwards:
  Wiktor Bochnak
  Mykhaylo Chikantsev
  Patrik Fric
  Krzysztof Jarczyk
  Bartłomiej Neupauer C
  Łukasz Kamiński
  Adrian Paweł Słowakiewicz
  Filip Wielkiewicz
  Fabian Kapica
  Jakub Worwa
  Tobiasz Kapica
  Kacper Malasinski
  Alex Maunula
   Martin Przygodzki
  Marat Soroka
  Rene Svitana
  Olexei Vorona
  Bartłomiej Wsół

External links 
Podhale Nowy Targ - official website (in Polish)
Website of Podhale's fans (in Polish)

Ice hockey teams in Poland
Interliga (1999–2007) teams
Sport in Lesser Poland Voivodeship
Nowy Targ County